The Promise is a 1976 solo album by Mike Pinder of The Moody Blues, recorded during their sabbatical from 1974 to 1977.

It was reissued on CD in August 1989.

Track listing
All tracks composed by Mike Pinder except where noted.

Side 1
"Free As a Dove" – 4:10
"You'll Make It Through" (Mike Pinder, Jim Dillon) – 3:52
"I Only Want to Love You" – 3:25
"Someone to Believe In" – 3:09

Side 2
"Carry On" – 4:16
"Air" – 2:20
"Message" – 2:46
"The Seed" – 1:25
"The Promise" – 6:02

The album was recorded in Pinder's studio at Malibu, Indigo Ranch.

There was a 1996 CD reissue of this album that had 2-bonus tracks:

  "One Step Into the Light" 5:44
  "Island to Island" 3:14

Personnel
Mike Pinder – synthesizer, acoustic guitar, 12 string guitar, piano, mellotron, vocals
Fred Beckmeier – bass guitar
Steve Beckmeier – acoustic guitar, electric guitar
Bill Berg – drums, percussion
Joel DiBartolo – double bass 
Jim Dillon – acoustic guitar, electric guitar, slide guitar, sitar, vocals
Jimmy Johnson – bass guitar
Bobby Keys – tenor saxophone
Jeannie King – vocals
Steve Madalo – trumpet
Susann McDonald – harp
Dean Olch – flute, shakuhachi
Tom Peterson – flute, tenor saxophone
William D. "Smitty" Smith – organ
Mike Azevedo - congas
Julia Tillman Waters – vocals
Maxine Willard Waters – vocals

Chart positions

Album

References

1976 debut albums
Mike Pinder albums
Threshold Records albums